100 North Main Street, also known as Wells Fargo Center, is a postmodern, 460-foot (140 m), 34-floor office skyscraper in Winston-Salem, North Carolina, United States. Originally named Wachovia Center, the building served as the corporate headquarters of Wachovia bank from 1995, the year of the tower's construction, to 2001, the year the corporation merged with First Union and moved its headquarters to Charlotte, North Carolina. It is the tallest building in the Piedmont Triad region and was the tallest in the Carolinas outside Charlotte until 2008, when RBC Plaza (now PNC Plaza) was completed in Raleigh.

The building was designed by Petronas Towers architect César Pelli and features Moravian architectural themes, which are widely found in Winston-Salem. Notable aspects include the Moravian arch, which was used in the dome's design, and the Moravian star, which was used on the lobby's mosaics. Pelli said the tower design resembled a rosebud about to bloom. It is sheathed in Olympia white granite and is the only granite-domed skyscraper in the world. The granite comes from a single quarry in Sardinia. The dome rises 59 ft (18 m) and houses mechanical equipment. The gardens around the site were designed by Cesar Pelli's wife Diana Balmori, a landscape architect. Atlanta based developer Taylor & Mathis, managed the development.

History
The building was built for Wachovia bank to replace the nearby Wachovia Building (which was renamed Winston Tower) as the corporation's world headquarters. Wachovia Center, as the tower was originally named, surpassed Winston Tower as Winston-Salem's tallest building. The building was constructed during a lull in skyscraper construction in the United States and was the tallest building completed in the entire country during the years of 1995 and 1996. The building remained Wachovia's corporate headquarters from its completion date in 1995 to 2001, when Wachovia merged with First Union. Once the merger was finalized, the corporation, which retained the Wachovia name, decided to locate its headquarters at One Wachovia Center in Charlotte, North Carolina. Wachovia subsequently sold Wachovia Center to American Financial Realty Trust in May 2004 for $39.6 million as part of a $546 million deal which included 150 bank properties. Wachovia bank continued to lease space in the tower, mostly for offices of its wealth management division.

2008

On April 1, 2008, American Financial was bought by Gramercy Capital, which assumed ownership of the building. Gramercy then sold the property to SL Winston-Salem LLC, on October 23, 2008 for $36 million.

Wachovia, which as of 2009 leased seventeen floors of 100 North Main Street, was purchased by Wells Fargo on December 31, 2008 and ceased to exist as a separate company in September 2011. It is uncertain whether Wells Fargo will elect to continue to lease space in the tower in near future, but Bobby Finch, 100 North Main Street's leasing handler, hoped "that the low cost of the lease will be attractive and compelling to Wells Fargo as it evaluates the Winston-Salem and Charlotte operations it is taking over from Wachovia."

2012
Wells Fargo, whose lease continued another thirteen years, occupied 65 percent of the building. Other major tenants included Deutsche Bank Securities, Morgan Stanley Smith Barney, Wake Forest Baptist Medical Center and the U.S. Department of Veterans Affairs.

2015

Linville Team Partners was contracted to lease vacant space, promoting the building as both the Wells Fargo Center, and 100 North Main Street, the building's formal address.

2018
A filing posted October 15, 2018 showed that WFC Property LLC of Oklahoma City purchased the building for $62 million.

See also

 List of tallest buildings in Winston-Salem
 List of tallest buildings in North Carolina
 Wachovia (disambiguation)
 Winston Tower

References

César Pelli buildings
Skyscraper office buildings in Winston-Salem, North Carolina
Office buildings completed in 1995